Artur Hjalmar Sölve Svensson (16 January 1901 – 20 January 1984) was a Swedish sprinter who competed in the 1924 Summer Olympics. He won a silver medal in the 4 × 400 m relay and failed to reach the final of the individual 400 m event.

References

Swedish male sprinters
Olympic silver medalists for Sweden
Athletes (track and field) at the 1924 Summer Olympics
Olympic athletes of Sweden
1901 births
1984 deaths
Medalists at the 1924 Summer Olympics
Olympic silver medalists in athletics (track and field)
Swedish middle-distance runners
20th-century Swedish people